J. M. (Jerry Miles) Humphrey (born  June 30, 1872) was a Free Methodist author and speaker in the Holiness Movement of the early 20th century. While in ministry, he divorced his wife, and married another woman seven years later. The day after the wedding, he began to harbor doubts about the propriety of this second marriage, and ultimately ended it after two years of soul-searching, which included eighteen months of mutual sexual abstinence. He wrote a testimony regarding the situation, declaring his repentance.

Publications
His published works include:
Select Fruits from the Highlands of Beulah  Lima, Ohio : True Gospel Grain Pub. Co., c1913. 227 p. ; 20 cm.
Crumbs From Heaven
Sin's By-Paths
Old-Time Religion
Impressive Talks
Fragments From The King's Table
A Word of Warning on Divorce - Marriage
Fire from the Pulpit
X-ray Sermons Omaha, Neb., "Anywhere" evangelistic workers’ publishing house [c1924] 247 p. 20 cm.
Daily Guide for the Sanctified Chicago, Ill., The Christian witness co. [c1917] 4 p. l., 7-147 p. 19½ cm.
Railroad Sermons from Railroad Stories  Chicago, Ill., Messenger publishing company, 1917. 84 p. 18 cm..
The Worker's Secret Of Unction
Spiritual Lessons From Every-day Life
Fifty Ready-Cut Sermons
Gleanings from Emmanuel’s Land Lima, Ohio, True Gospel Grain Pub. Co., 1911. 63, [1] p. 18 cm.
Echoes from Three Worlds: Sacred Poems Cleveland, Ohio : True Gospel Grain Pub. Co., c1908. 78 p. ; 18 cm.
	A Soul's First Day in Heaven
The Lost Soul’s First Day in Eternity , c1912.
Sermons That Never Die, Allegheny Publications (January 1, 1990)
Revival Fire in Song

He also wrote lyrics for several hymns.

References

American religious writers
1872 births
Year of death missing
Free Methodist Church ministers